Two American League baseball franchises have borne the name "Washington Senators".  The first franchise was one of the teams that was originally part of the American League when it became a Major League in 1901.  That franchise moved to Minnesota after the 1960 season, becoming the Minnesota Twins.  It was replaced by a new Washington Senators franchise in 1961. That franchise moved to Arlington, Texas after the 1971 season, becoming the Texas Rangers.  The Washington Senators played in three home ball parks over their history.  They started in American League Park and moved to American League Park II in 1903. In 1911, they moved to Griffith Stadium, where they remained until 1961. The first game of the new baseball season for a team is played on Opening Day, and being named the Opening Day starter is an honor, which is often given to the player who is expected to lead the pitching staff that season, though there are various strategic reasons why a team's best pitcher might not start on Opening Day.

The 1901-1960 franchise won 32 Opening Day games against 28 losses.  The 1901-1960 franchise had a record in Opening Day games at home of 26 wins and 21 losses.  On the road, they had an Opening Day record of six wins and seven losses.

The 1901-1960 franchise used 32 Opening Day starting pitchers in their 60 seasons in Washington.  One pitcher made Opening Day starts for both franchises.  Camilo Pascual made two Opening Day starts for the 1901-1960 franchise, in 1956 and 1960, and later made two Opening Day starts for the 1961-1971 franchise.

Walter Johnson holds the record for most Opening Day starts for either franchise, with 14 Opening Day starts for the 1901-1960 franchise between 1910 and 1926, including ten consecutive Opening Day starts from 1912 through 1921.  Dutch Leonard made four Opening Day starts for the 1901-1960 franchise between 1940 and 1945.  Bob Porterfield made three Opening Day starts for the 1901-1960 franchise between 1952 and 1955.  Other pitchers with multiple Opening Day starts for the 1901-1960 franchise are Al Orth, Long Tom Hughes, Charlie Smith, George Mogridge, Alvin Crowder, Earl Whitehill, Early Wynn, Pedro Ramos and Pascual, with two apiece.

The Senators won three American League championships in their history, all by the 1901-1960 franchise. They won the World Series in 1924, but lost in 1925 and 1933. The Senators' Opening Day starters in their American League championship years were Johnson in 1924, Mogridge in 1925 and Crowder in 1933.

Key

1901 through 1960 franchise

Footnotes
  Camilo Pascual had two Opening Day starts for the 1901-1960 franchise in 1956 and 1960 and two Opening Day starts for the 1961-1971 franchise in  1968 and 1969.  He also received the decision as a relief pitcher on Opening Day 1957 for the 1901-1960 franchise.

References
General

Specific

Opening day starters
Lists of Major League Baseball Opening Day starting pitchers
Washington Senators (1901–1960)